Grayson–Gravely House is a historic home located near Graysontown, Montgomery County, Virginia.  The house was built in 1891, and is a two-story, three-bay, frame Victorian dwelling with a central passage plan. It has a standing seam metal gable roof.  It has a three-bay porch supported by Doric order columns and a three-stage tower with rooms on the first and third floors and a porch on the second, The porches feature a number of decorative elements including elaborate sawn balusters, a frieze with brackets, dentils, and tablets.

It was listed on the National Register of Historic Places in 1989.

References

Houses on the National Register of Historic Places in Virginia
Victorian architecture in Virginia
Houses completed in 1891
Houses in Montgomery County, Virginia
National Register of Historic Places in Montgomery County, Virginia